is a town located in Funai District, Kyoto Prefecture, Japan. , the town had an estimated population of 13,195 in 6188 households and a population density of 44 persons per km². Its name comes from the first syllable of Kyōto and the former town of Tamba, a namesake of the historic Tanba Province.

Geography 
Kyōtamba is located between the Fukuchiyama basin and the Kameoka basins in the central part of the Tamba region in central Kyoto Prefecture. the southern part of the town is the watershed between the Yodo River system and the Yura River systems.

Neighbouring municipalities 
Kyoto Prefecture
 Ayabe
 Fukuchiyama
 Nantan
Hyōgo Prefecture
 Sasayama

Climate
Kyōtamba has a Humid subtropical climate (Köppen Cfa) characterized by warm summers and cool winters with light to no snowfall.  The average annual temperature in Kyōtamba is 13.7 °C. The average annual rainfall is 1771 mm with September as the wettest month. The temperatures are highest on average in August, at around 25.5 °C, and lowest in January, at around 2.4 °C.

Demographics
Per Japanese census data, the population of Kyōtamba peaked around 1950 and has declined by roughly half in the decades since.

History
The area of the modern town of Kyōtamba was within ancient Tanba Province.  In the Edo Period, most of the area was tenryō territory controlled directly by the Tokugawa shogunate. The village of Shuchi was established  with the creation of the modern municipalities system on April 1, 1889.  It was elevated to town status on July 19, 1901 and changed its name to Tanba on April 1, 1955. The town of Kyōtamba was founded on October 11, 2005, by the merger of the former towns of Tanba, Mizuho and Wachi, all from Funai District.

Government
Kyōtamba has a mayor-council form of government with a directly elected mayor and a unicameral town council of 13 members. Kyōtamba, together with the city of Nantan contributes one member to the Kyoto Prefectural Assembly. In terms of national politics, the town is part of Kyoto4th district of the lower house of the Diet of Japan.

Economy
Kyōtamba has an economy based on agriculture and forestry. The main products include grapes, matsutake mushrooms, black soybeans, chestnuts, Tamba beef, Kyōtamba pork and Tanba wine.

Education
Kyōtamba has five public elementary schools and three public middle schools operated by the town government and one public high school operated by the Kyoto Prefectural Department of Education. The prefecture also operates one forestry training school,

Transportation

Railway 
 JR West – San'in Main Line
  -  -  -

Highway
 Kyoto Jūkan Expressway

Sister city relations
 - City of Hawkesbury, Australia, since 1988

Noted people from Kyōtamba 
Kenji Hatanaka, Imperial Japanese Army officer
Atsushi Sakahara, movie director and producer

References

External links

Kyōtamba official website 

Towns in Kyoto Prefecture
Kyōtamba, Kyoto